(meaning in English "Meirion-Dwyfor College"), also known as CMD, is a college in , Wales with its main campus in . It has a bilingual language policy and offers the opportunity to study most subjects through the medium of Welsh.

The  campus was previously occupied by Dr Williams School.

Notable former pupils include the singer Duffy, who was elected president of the Students' union.

The merged organisation is one of the largest further education colleges in the UK, located at twelve campuses across four counties. Although the colleges have merged their management and have a central administration, the  campuses retain the  name.

References

External links
Coleg Meirion-Dwyfor - Grwp Llandrillo Menai

Dolgellau
Llandwrog
Pwllheli
Further education colleges in Gwynedd
Further education colleges in Snowdonia